The Conness Lakes are a group of small lakes at the foot of Conness Glacier in Mono County, California, in the United States.

The Conness Lakes are named for John Conness, a United States Senator from California.

See also
List of lakes in California

References

Lakes of California
Lakes of Mono County, California
Lakes of Northern California